The Knightsbridge Residences, also known as The Knightsbridge Residences @ Century City, is a high-end residential skyscraper constructed in Makati, Philippines. It is the second of several building projects built in the new Century City area along Kalayaan Avenue. It is one of the Philippines' tallest buildings. The Knightsbridge Residences at Century City takes its name after the most expensive neighborhood in London, Knightsbridge.

Planned to be more than 50 storeys high, the owner and developer Century City Development Corporation is now pre-selling units for a 60th floor, and is still subject to increases depending on demands for more units. Based on 60 storeys, the building will have a total height from ground to its architectural top of around 215 ± 5 meters (705 ± 15 feet).

Location

The Knightsbridge Residences is located within the former location of the 4.8-hectare International School Manila, which 3.4 hectares was sold to Century Properties Corporation (the remaining was sold to Picar Properties) in a bidding by the Philippine Government in 2007. Situated along Kalayaan Avenue, it is just a block away from the busy entertainment area along Makati Avenue. It is also about a few blocks away from the Makati Central Business District, the capital’s financial, cultural and entertainment hub with first-class shopping malls, and about 30 minutes drive from the international airport.

Design and construction

The Knightsbridge Residences was part of the masterplan made by California-based architectural group Jerde Partnership International, and was designed by Philippine architectural firm ASYA Design Partners. Structural design and engineering is provided by renowned Filipino structural engineering firm Aromin & Sy + Associates. 

Project and construction management is being handled by local firm Nova Construction + Development. The lobby and common areas of the building, particularly The Podium Level amenity floor will be designed by Hong Kong-based International Leisure Consultants (ILC).

Architecture

The building introduces the Lantern concept, a unique architectural featuring stacked special residential units with dramatic floor-to-ceiling windows that create iconic, sparkling glass boxes. This will be a distinguishing feature \which can easily be seen around the city, especially at night.

The building will have a maximum of 20 units per floor, each with a floor to ceiling clearance of 2.7 meters, and will have 300 parking slots available in 4 basement floors.

See also
List of tallest buildings in the Philippines
The Gramercy Residences

References

External links
 Official Website
 Official Website of the Century City

Skyscrapers in Makati
Residential skyscrapers in Metro Manila
Residential buildings completed in 2013